Casandra may refer to:

 Casandra Stark, female film director
 Cristina Casandra (born 1977), Romanian long-distance runner
 Silviu Casandra (born 1975), Romanian race walker

See also
 Cassandra (disambiguation)
 Cassi (disambiguation)
 Cassie (disambiguation)
 Kassandra (disambiguation)
 Kassie (disambiguation)
 Kasi (disambiguation)